The Spiderwick Chronicles is a 2008 American fantasy film based on the book series of the same name by Holly Black and Tony DiTerlizzi. It was directed by Mark Waters and stars Freddie Highmore, Mary-Louise Parker and Sarah Bolger, with Nick Nolte, Seth Rogen, and Martin Short in voice roles. The film, set in the Spiderwick Estate in New England, follows three children who discover a field guide to fairies while encountering various magical creatures such as goblins, ogres, brownies, boggarts, hobgoblins, trolls and many others.

The film is dedicated to Scott Rathner, who died in August 12, 2007. 
Produced by Nickelodeon Movies and distributed by Paramount Pictures, it was released on February 14, 2008, earning $162.8 million against its $90 million budget. The Spiderwick Chronicles received generally positive reviews from critics, with Highmore's dual performance being singled out for praise. The film was released on DVD and Blu-ray on June 24, 2008, in the United States.

Plot
In 1928, Arthur Spiderwick writes a field guide about the many fairies he has encountered. After finishing the Book, he hides it away for fear of Mulgarath, a shapeshifting ogre who plans to use the Book's secrets for evil.
 	
Eighty years later, recently divorced Helen Grace inherits and moves into the abandoned Spiderwick estate with her children, daughter Mallory and twin sons Jared and Simon. Jared is angry about the move and would rather live with his father, Richard Grace. After uncovering a hidden dumbwaiter, Jared discovers Arthur's study where he finds the Field Guide. When Jared explains his discovery of the Book and the existence of magical creatures, his family doesn't believe him.
 	
The next morning, Jared meets a brownie named Thimbletack, who is initially angry with Jared for having opened the book that Thimbletack was supposed to be protecting from Mulgarath. Jared placates him with crackers and honey, and Thimbletack gives Jared a holed stone that allows Jared to see the normally invisible faeries by looking through it. Thimbletack tells him about the protective mushroom circle surrounding the house.
 	
Jared then witnesses Simon's abduction by goblins, led by Redcap. Simon is taken to the goblins' campsite where he is confronted by Mulgarath who is disguised as an old man. Jared sneaks into the campsite to save him where he meets Hogsqueal, a hobgoblin, who gives Jared the ability to see faeries without the stone by spitting in his eyes so that he can help him get revenge on Mulgarath for killing his family. Mulgarath releases Simon so he can fetch the Book for him. Jared finds Simon and both fight over the Book before they are chased by the goblins. The twins flee back to the house, and Mallory, upon almost being ambushed by the goblins, which cause her to realize Jared was right, fights them off with her fencing sabre.
	
After failing to try and burn the Book due to a protective spell over it, the children decide to visit Arthur's daughter, their great-aunt Lucinda Spiderwick, for advice. While Simon distracts the goblins, Mallory and Jared, taking the Book with, escape through an underground tunnel. Chased by a troll sent by Redcap, they narrowly escape when it is struck and killed by an oncoming truck. Jared and Mallory meet the elderly Lucinda in the psychiatric hospital where she lives, surrounded by sprites. She tells the children that they need to find her father and have him destroy the Book and that, for eighty years, Arthur has been held captive by the sylphs. At that moment, Redcap and his goblins attack them through the window and manage to tear off several pages from the Book before being driven off. Among the stolen pages, Mulgarath is pleased to find information on how to break the protective circle.
 	
While Helen is driving Jared and Mallory home, she and Jared argue over her disbelief; Jared angrily tells Helen that he hates her and doesn't want to live with her anymore. Later, Hogsqueal, having overheard Mulgarath's plan, informs the children while also giving Simon and Mallory the ability to see faeries as well. Jared then tries to call his father again, but a sympathetic Mallory tells him that their father has moved in with another woman after his and Helen's divorce and won't be coming for him, causing a heartbroken Jared to regret his angry words to Helen earlier. Jared, Simon, and Mallory then use the Book to summon a griffin, which takes them to the sylphs' realm. There, they meet Arthur, who has not aged and is unaware of the time he has spent there. Jared asks him to destroy the Book only to find out that Thimbletack had switched the pages with a cookbook and kept the real Book. Arthur is relieved until Jared tells him that Mulgarath knows how to break the protective circle. Arthur informs Jared that the sylphs won't allow them to leave as they, like him, know too much about the faeries. Arthur helps them escape by distracting the sylphs with the fake book.
	
At home, the children finally convince Helen of the truth when they save her from the goblins' attempted ambush and then her seeing Thimbletack upon her return home. Meanwhile, the goblins finish spreading their potion, which successfully breaks the circle as the full moon rises. The family defend themselves with kitchen knives and tomato sauce/salt bombs (ingredients deadly to goblins) that Simon and Thimbletack made earlier and manage to kill Redcap and the goblins in an explosion of tomato sauce. Suddenly, Richard appears, claiming that he has decided to come back and stay with them; however, Jared, having remembered what Mallory told him earlier, stabs him, revealing him to be Mulgarath in disguise. Mulgarath then pursues Jared and the Book throughout the house before cornering him on the roof. Jared outwits the ogre by tossing the book over the side of the roof. Mulgarath transforms into a bird to catch it, but he is suddenly grabbed and eaten by Hogsqueal. Afterwards, Jared and his mother reconcile, with Jared deciding to live with her and they help Simon, Mallory, and Hogsqueal gather the Book's scattered pages.
 	
Several weeks later, the family brings Lucinda to visit Thimbletack and the house. The sylphs then arrive with Arthur, allowing him to briefly visit now that the Book is safe. However, Arthur cannot stay long as he will turn to dust if he remains. Lucinda asks to go with him and is transformed back into a child. The Grace family watch as the sylphs spirit Arthur and Lucinda away before resuming their normal lives with Thimbletack, Hogsqueal, and the griffin.

Cast
 Freddie Highmore as the Grace twins
 Jared Grace: The main protagonist, the black sheep of the family, and the most reluctant about moving from New York. 
 Simon Grace: Jared's identical twin brother and a pacifistic animal lover.
 Mary-Louise Parker as Helen Grace: the children's overprotective mother.
 Sarah Bolger as Mallory Grace: Jared and Simon's firm and brave older sister.
 Andrew McCarthy as Richard Grace: Jared, Simon, and Mallory's divorced and neglectful father.
 McCarthy also portrays Mulgarath's disguise of Richard.
 Joan Plowright as Lucinda Spiderwick, the daughter of Arthur Spiderwick and of Constance Spiderwick.
 Jordy Benattar as Young Lucinda Spiderwick
 David Strathairn as Arthur Spiderwick, the author of the guide and former owner of the mansion.
 Lise Durocher-Viens as Constance Spiderwick, the wife of Arthur Spiderwick and mother of Lucinda Spiderwick
 Tod Fennell as Helen Grace's co-worker
 Mariah Inger as Nurse
 Jeremy Lavalley as Tow Truck Driver

Voice cast
 Nick Nolte as Mulgarath, an evil shapeshifting ogre, the leader of the goblins, and the main antagonist.
 Nolte also portrays Mulgarath in his human form. 
 Seth Rogen as Hogsqueal, an unintelligent bird-eating hobgoblin who seeks revenge against Mulgarath for killing his family.
 Martin Short as Thimbletack, a loyal house brownie who shapeshifts into an aggressive boggart when he becomes angry.
 Ron Perlman as Redcap, Mulgarath's aggressive and loyal general of his goblin army – his role is uncredited.
 Ben Diskin, Bob Joles, Jonathan Lipow, John Mariano, Nolan North, Chris Parson, and Fred Tatasciore performs the goblin voices.

Production

Filming

In an interview, Sarah Bolger said that filming took 4–5 months. She said that she "was [in front of] the blue screen like 24 hours a day", and for the most part, she was "kicking and slicing and chopping things that were nowhere near". Since Bolger had many fencing scenes, she had five weeks of intense training, and three hours with the Canadian Olympic fencing coach nearly every day.

Music

Reception

Critical response
On Rotten Tomatoes the film has an approval rating of 81% based on 149 reviews, with an average rating of 6.70/10. The site's critical consensus reads: "The Spiderwick Chronicles is an entertaining children's adventure, with heart and imagination to spare." On Metacritic the film has an average score of 62 out of 100, based on 30 reviews. Audiences surveyed by CinemaScore gave the film a grade "A−" on scale of A to F.

Critics called it "decent entertainment," "a work of both modest enchantment and enchanting modesty," and "modest and reasonably charming." It was criticized for its reliance on special effects; A. O. Scott of The New York Times said that the movie "feels more like a sloppy, secondhand pander" and called it "frantic with incident and hectic with computer-generated effects," and another said that "the sense of wonder and magic is lost in the shuffle." Despite some negative reviews for the film overall, Highmore was generally praised for his dual role as the twins Simon and Jared. One critic said that he "skillfully portrays two distinctive personas," another said he "[had] no trouble grasping the task at hand," and a third remarked that, "the most special effect is probably Highmore".

The film was nominated by the Visual Effects Society in the category of "Outstanding Animated Character in a Live Action Feature Motion Picture" but it lost to The Curious Case of Benjamin Button, another film from Paramount Pictures.Box office
In its opening weekend, the film grossed an estimated $19 million in 3,847 theaters in the United States and Canada, ranking #2 behind Jumper at the box office. With the opening day's gross on Thursday included, the film grossed an estimated $24.3 million on its opening weekend. This film has grossed $162.8 million worldwide.

Home media
The film was released on DVD and Blu-ray on June 24, 2008 in the United States. It was re-released on DVD and Blu-ray on September 12, 2017 in the United States.
Television series

On November 12, 2021, Disney announced that a series would be filmed and released on Disney+. It will be produced by 20th Television with parternship from Paramount Television. The series will not be co-produced by Nickelodeon due to it being produced by Disney and Paramount only. It is also not related to this film.

Video game

Vivendi Games, under their Sierra Entertainment label enlisted Stormfront Studios to develop and produce a video game adaptation of The Spiderwick Chronicles, following the general storyline of the books and film. It was released, shortly before the film's opening, on February 5, 2008 for Nintendo DS, Wii, PC, Xbox 360, and PlayStation 2, and rated Everyone (E10+) by the ESRB.

See also
 List of films featuring home invasions
 Jumanji''

References

External links

 
 
 
 
 Full production notes
 Parentalsite.com Review

Film
2008 films
2000s fantasy adventure films
2000s monster movies
American children's adventure films
American fantasy adventure films
2000s children's fantasy films
American dark fantasy films
American monster movies
Goblin films
Films about fairies and sprites
Films about twin brothers
Films about dysfunctional families
Films based on children's books
Films directed by Mark Waters
Films scored by James Horner
Films shot in Montreal
High fantasy films
IMAX films
The Kennedy/Marshall Company films
Nickelodeon Movies films
Paramount Pictures films
Films with screenplays by John Sayles
Films with screenplays by Karey Kirkpatrick
Films based on multiple works of a series
Films set in country houses
Ogres in film
2000s English-language films
2000s American films